Rochdale Borough Council is the local authority of the Metropolitan Borough of Rochdale in Greater Manchester, England. It is a metropolitan district council, one of ten in Greater Manchester and one of 36 in the metropolitan counties of England, and provides the majority of local government services in Rochdale.

Wards and councillors 
Each ward is represented by three councillors.

See also
Rochdale local elections

References

External links

Metropolitan district councils of England
Local authorities in Greater Manchester
Leader and cabinet executives
Local education authorities in England
Billing authorities in England
1974 establishments in England
Borough Council